Robert Lee Castleman (born July 14, 1952) is a Nashville singer and songwriter.

He released his debut album, Crazy as Me, on Rounder Records in 2000. At the Grammy Award in 2002, he won Best Country Song category as the writer of the song "The Lucky One" performed by Alison Krauss & Union Station.

Other songs which Castleman has written include Alan Jackson's "The Firefly's Song", "Like Red on a Rose" (nominated for Grammy Award in 2007 in the Best Country Song category), "Maybe I Should Stay Here", "Nobody Said That It Would Be Easy", and "Where Do I Go from Here (A Trucker's Song)"; Alison Krauss & Union Station's "Doesn't Have to Be This Way", "Forget About It", "Gravity", "Let Me Touch You for Awhile", "Paper Airplane" and "Restless"; Chet Atkins's "Sneakin' Around", "Somebody Loves Me Now", "Take a Look At Her Now"; and  Jon Randall 's "My Life".

References

External links

American country singer-songwriters
Grammy Award winners
Living people
Place of birth missing (living people)
Country musicians from Tennessee
1952 births
Singer-songwriters from Tennessee